Frosti Jonsson, known as Bistro Boy (born 1 May 1972) is an Icelandic musician.

Frosti was the founder of one of Iceland's largest annual LGBTQ+ events, Bears on Ice, which was started in 2005. The first LGBTQ+ event in Iceland, it is not-for-profit, and is still one of the three largest. It features a number of musical acts at different venues over a several day period each September.

He released his first EP album "Sólheimar" on the Icelandic record label. His first album, released on Möller Records as well was LP album Journey (December 2013) and in 2016 he released LP album Svartir Sandar. He collaborated with the Japanese ambient/drone artists Nobuto Suda on the EP album Rivers & Poems released in 2015. He has worked with the singer Páll Óskar writing and producing the song Walk Away as well as writing the lyrics of the song which is the last song on Paul's album Kristalsplatan.

Discography 
 PNO (Compilation album, LP, 2021)
 Drifting (LP, 2021)
 Ambient Theory Of Dreaming (LP, 2020)
 evolve (LP, 2020)
 Broken (EP, 2019) with Bjartmar Þórðarson
 Sunday Coma / Colours (7” with Rayspark Industries, 2019)
 Narti / Smile (7” with Skurken, 2019)
 Píanó í þokunni (LP, 2018)
 Walk Away (single, feat. Páll Óskar, 2017)
 Open Doors (single, feat on Möller Records Compilation Album, Helga Vol.6, 2017)
 Svartir Sandar (LP, 2016)
 Memories (Single, 2016), feat. Edward F. Butler
 Rivers & Poems (EP, 2015), with Nobuto Suda.
 Lovin´life (single, 2015) feat. Anthony Jackson
 Dagdraumaregn (Nýdönsk Remix, 2015)
 Hundslappadrifa (single, feat on Möller Records Compilation Album, Helga Vol.5, 2015)
 U-Bahn (Möller Records Compilation album Helga Vol.4, 2014)
 Frozen thoughts, single feat. Gísli Magna (Remix, 2014)
 Journey (LP, 2013)
 Sólheimar (EP, 2012)
 Motional (Möller Records Compilation album Helga Vol.2, 2012)

References 

Icelandic musicians
Icelandic male musicians
Jonsson, Frosti
Jonsson, Frosti